William Albion Gibbs (5 July 1879 – 17 August 1944) was an Australian politician.

Born at Melbourne, he was educated at King's College in Fitzroy. He served in the military from 1900–1902 and 1914–1916. He was a miner at Cobar in New South Wales and an organiser of Amalgamated Miners' Associated, as well as Assistant Secretary of the New South Wales Labor Party from 1917–1926.

On 1 April 1925, Gibbs was appointed to the Australian Senate to fill the vacancy caused by the death of New South Wales Labor Senator Jack Power, who had been appointed less than six months previously to fill the vacancy caused by the death of Allan McDougall. Gibbs did not contest the 1925 election and subsequently retired from politics. He died in 1944.

References

1879 births
1944 deaths
Australian Labor Party members of the Parliament of Australia
Members of the Australian Senate for New South Wales
Members of the Australian Senate
20th-century Australian politicians
Australian miners